Frances Isabella Haselden ( – 9 July 1936) was a New Zealand headmistress. She was born in London, England, in about 1842. She was headmistress of Kauaeranga Girls' School in Thames.

References

1842 births
1936 deaths
New Zealand educators
English emigrants to New Zealand
19th-century New Zealand people
Women school principals and headteachers